Coa  is a townland and hamlet in Magheracross civil parish, County Fermanagh, Northern Ireland.
It is located east of the town of Ballinamallard and is 399.11 acres in area. Landmarks include St Marys  Church Coa, Cavanalough Glebe and Killee Lough.

History
Religion has played a large part in the History of Coa. About 450AD the parish was said to have been founded by St Patrick and about 550 AD  St Columba passed thorough the area. In 1769 John Wesley visited the district bringing Methodism and Coa Chapel was built in 1770. In the early 20th century further religious movements swept the district.

It is the birthplace of Ipswich Town manager Kieran McKenna.

References

Villages in County Fermanagh
Townlands of County Fermanagh